Isotoma is a common genus of springtails, the type genus of the family Isotomidae, containing the following species:

Isotoma acrea Wray, 1953
Isotoma agrelli Delamare, 1950
Isotoma alaskana Christiansen & Bellinger, 1980
Isotoma alaskensis Fjellberg, 1978
Isotoma albella Packard, 1873
Isotoma alpa Christiansen & Bellinger, 1980
Isotoma arborea Linnaeus, 1758
Isotoma aspera Bacon, 1914
Isotoma atkasukiensis Fjellberg, 1978
Isotoma beta Christiansen & Bellinger, 1980
Isotoma blufusata Fjellberg, 1978
Isotoma brucealla Wray, 1953
Isotoma caeruleatra Guthrie, 1903
Isotoma canadensis Brown, 1932
Isotoma cancellarei Christiansen & Bellinger, 1980
Isotoma carpenteri Börner, 1909
Isotoma christianseni Fjellberg, 1978
Isotoma communa MacGillivray, 1896
Isotoma creli Fjellberg, 1978
Isotoma dispar Christiansen & Bellinger, 1988
Isotoma ekmani Fjellberg, 1977
Isotoma fennica Reuter, 1895
Isotoma flora Christiansen & Bellinger, 1980
Isotoma gelida Folsom, 1937
Isotoma glauca Packard, 1873
Isotoma hiemalis Schött, 1893
Isotoma inupikella Fjellberg, 1978
Isotoma japonica Yosii, 1939
Isotoma komarkovae Fjellberg, 1978
Isotoma longipenna MacGillivray, 1896
Isotoma louisiana Scott, 1962
Isotoma lucama Wray, 1952
Isotoma macleani Fjellberg, 1978
Isotoma manitobae Fjellberg, 1978
Isotoma manubriata MacGillivray, 1896
Isotoma marisca Christiansen & Bellinger, 1988
Isotoma marissa Folsom, 1937
Isotoma maxillosa Fjellberg, 1978
Isotoma monochaeta Kos, 1942
Isotoma monta Christiansen & Bellinger, 1980
Isotoma multisetis Carpenter & Phillips, 1922
Isotoma nanseni Fjellberg, 1978
Isotoma neglecta Schäffer, 1900
Isotoma nigrifrons Folsom, 1937
Isotoma nixoni Fjellberg, 1978
Isotoma notabilis Schäffer, 1896
Isotoma nympha Snider & Calandrino, 1987
Isotoma persea Wray, 1952
Isotoma propinqua Axelson, 1902
Isotoma pseudocinerea Fjellberg, 1975
Isotoma quadra Christiansen & Bellinger, 1980
Isotoma randiella Fjellberg, 1978
Isotoma sandersoni Wray, 1952
Isotoma sensibilis Tullberg, 1876
Isotoma spatulata Chamberlain, 1943
Isotoma speciosa MacGillivray, 1896
Isotoma sphagneticola Linnaniemi, 1912
Isotoma subaequalis Folsom, 1937
Isotoma subviridis Folsom, 1937
Isotoma taigicola Fjellberg, 1978
Isotoma tariva Wray, 1953
Isotoma tigrina Nicolet, 1842
Isotoma torildae Fjellberg, 1978
Isotoma tridentata MacGillivray, 1896
Isotoma trispinata MacGillivray, 1896
Isotoma tuckeri Christiansen & Bellinger, 1980
Isotoma tunica Christiansen & Bellinger, 1980
Isotoma uniens Christiansen & Bellinger, 1980
Isotoma viridis Bourlet, 1839
Isotoma walkerii Packard, 1871

References

Springtail genera